Ionic or Ionian may refer to:

Arts and entertainment
 Ionic meter, a poetic metre in ancient Greek and Latin poetry
 Ionian mode, a musical mode or a diatonic scale

Places and peoples
 Ionian, of or from Ionia, an ancient region in western Anatolia
 Ionians, one of four major tribes of the ancient Greeks
 Ionian Sea, part of the Mediterranean Sea
 Ionian Islands, a group of islands in Greece

Science
 Ionian, of or relating to Io, a moon of the planet Jupiter
 Ionian stage, a proposed name for the now-defined Chibanian stage in stratigraphy.
 Ionic, of or relating to an ion, an atom or molecule with a net electric charge
 Ionic bonding, a type chemical bonding
Ionic compound, a chemical compound involving ionic bonding

Other uses
 Ionic Greek, an ancient dialect of the Greek language
 Ionic (mobile app framework), a software development kit
 Ionic order, one of the orders of classical architecture
 Ionian Technologies, an American biotechnology company
 Hull Ionians, an English rugby club
 Ionic No. 5, a typeface
 , the name of two ships of the White Star Line.

See also

Ioniq - automotive brand of the Hyundai Motor Company

 Ion (disambiguation)
 Ionia (disambiguation)
 Ionian School (disambiguation)
 Ionica (disambiguation)
 Ionikos (disambiguation)
 Iona, an island in the Inner Hebrides of Scotland